Zibqine is a town in South Lebanon,  from the capital, Beirut, 4 km from the border with Israel and  above sea level.

It was heavily damaged in the 2006 Lebanon-Israel war and underwent a heavy process of rebuilding.

Name
According to E. H. Palmer, the name probably comes from the Arabic word for "to bind", or "confine".

History
In 1596, it was named as a village, Zibqin, in the Ottoman nahiya (subdistrict) of  Tibnin  under the liwa' (district) of Safad, with a population of 12 households and 12 bachelor, all Muslim. The villagers paid a fixed  tax rate of 25% on  agricultural products, such as wheat, barley, olive trees,  goats and beehives, in addition to "occasional revenues" and winter pastures; a total of 3,172 akçe.

In 1875, Victor Guérin found the village to contain eighty Metawileh. He further  "observed a great pool, constructed with regularly cut stones, and several broken columns. On the chapter of one he saw a mosaic representing a cross fleuronnée, which proves that it came from a church."

In 1881, the PEF's Survey of Western Palestine (SWP) described it: "Small ruined village on a hill, surrounded by brushwood; contains about thirty Moslems [..], and has olives and arable land to the south. The water is supplied by cisterns."

During the  2006 Lebanon-Israel war, on 13 July, 12 civilians were killed by Israeli missiles, fired on the house of the late Mukhtar. All the victims belonged to the  Bzeih family, and they included 6  women and 5 children, aged between 11 and 78 years of age. There was no Hezbollah activity in the vicinity at the time of the attack. The IDF gave no explanations as to why the house had been attacked.

References

Bibliography

External links
Survey of Western Palestine, Map 3:  IAA, Wikimedia commons
Zebqine, Localiban
http://zebqine.com
    

Populated places in the Israeli security zone 1985–2000
Populated places in Tyre District 
Shia Muslim communities in Lebanon